Canace is a genus of beach flies in the family Canacidae. All known species are of Afrotropical or Palaearctic distribution.

Species
Canace actites (Mathis, 1982)
Canace nasica (Haliday, 1839)
Canace rossii (Canzoneri, 1982)
Canace salonitana (Strobl, 1900)
Canace zvuv (Mathis & Freidberg, 1991)

References

Canacidae
Schizophora genera
Taxa named by Alexander Henry Haliday